Che' Puan Besar Khaleeda binti Bustamam (born 16 July 1993) is the wife of Tunku Ismail Idris. Through her marriage she is known as the Consort of the Crown Prince of the Malaysian State of Johor.

Early life 
Khaleeda binti Bustamam was born on 16 July 1993 at the Kuala Lumpur General Hospital in Kuala Lumpur, Malaysia. She is the fifth child of Bustamam bin Daud and Aziyah binti Abdul Aziz. She attended Sekolah Rendah Kebangsaan Taman Seri Gombak in Selangor from 2001 until 2003, where she participated in dance and track & field. She moved to England when her mother served at the Malaysian High Commissioner in the United Kingdom. While in England she attended St. George's School at Hanover Square before enrolling at Westminster Academy in London in 2004. In 2009, she returned to Malaysia and studied at the Sri Utama School in Kuala Lumpur and graduated in 2010.

Personal life 
Khaleeda married Tunku Ismail Idris, the Crown Prince of Johor, on 24 October 2014 in a private ceremony at Istana Bukit Serene.

Upon her marriage she was granted the title of Che' Puan (equivalent to the English "Lady") as a Crown Prince's consort that was non-royal blood.

She gave birth to their first child and eldest daughter, Tunku Khalsom Aminah Sofiah, on 25 June 2016. On 14 October 2017 she gave birth to their second child and first son, Tunku Iskandar Abdul Jalil Abu Bakar Ibrahim (the Raja Muda of Johor).
She gave birth to their third child and second son, Tunku Abu Bakar Ibrahim who was born on 17 July 2019. On 21 April 2021, She gave birth to their fourth child and second daughter, Tunku Zahrah Zarith Aziyah.

Khaleeda was awarded Knight Grand Commander of the Order of the Crown of Johor (SPMJ) on 15 March 2015 and the Grand Commander of the Royal Family Order of Johor (DK I) on 23 March 2019 by Sultan Ibrahim Ismail of Johor. She was appointed Pro-Chancellor of University of Technology Malaysia in 2021. She speaks fluent Malay, English, and Spanish.

Royal title
By royal command of her father-in-law, His Majesty Sultan Ibrahim Ibni Almarhum Sultan Iskandar, the Johor Council of the Royal Court is pleased to announced the honorific form of address for the Consort of the Crown Prince of Johor, Che' Puan Khaleeda binti Bustamam as Her Highness Che' Puan Besar Khaleeda binti Bustamam with immediate effect on 23 March 2021.

Honours 

Che' Puan Besar Khaleeda was conferred with the following royal honours:

Honours of Johor 
   Royal Family Order of Johor : 
 First Class – Grand Commander of the Royal Family Order of Johor (DK I) on 23 March 2019.
   Order of the Crown of Johor : 
 First Class – Knight Grand Commander of the Order of the Crown of Johor (SPMJ) on 15 March 2015.

Issue

References

External links

Living people
1993 births
House of Temenggong of Johor
Malaysian Muslims
Johor royal consorts
Princesses by marriage
People from Kuala Lumpur
First Classes of the Royal Family Order of Johor
Knights Grand Commander of the Order of the Crown of Johor